The Akkas gas field is an Iraqi natural gas field that was discovered in 1992. It began production in 1993 and produces natural gas and condensates. The total proven reserves of the Akkas gas field are around 5.6 trillion cubic feet (160×109m3) and production is slated to be around 400 million cubic feet/day (11.4×106m3).

References

Natural gas fields of Iraq